WWE Clash at the Castle was a professional wrestling pay-per-view (PPV) and livestreaming event produced by the American promotion WWE. It was held for wrestlers from the promotion's Raw and SmackDown brand divisions. The event took place on Saturday, September 3, 2022, at the Principality Stadium in Cardiff, Wales. This marks WWE's first major stadium event to take place in the United Kingdom since the 1992 SummerSlam and the company's first UK PPV overall since Insurrextion in 2003. The event's title is a reference to Cardiff Castle, which is situated near the Principality Stadium.

Seven matches were contested at the event, including one on the Kickoff pre-show. In the main event, Roman Reigns defeated Drew McIntyre to retain the Undisputed WWE Universal Championship. In other prominent matches, Seth "Freakin" Rollins defeated Matt Riddle, Gunther defeated Sheamus to retain SmackDown's Intercontinental Championship, and in the opening bout, Damage CTRL (Bayley, Dakota Kai, and Iyo Sky) defeated Bianca Belair, Alexa Bliss, and Asuka in a six-woman tag team match. The event was also notable for the main roster debuts of NXT's Giovanni Vinci, who rejoined Gunther and Ludwig Kaiser to reform Imperium, and Solo Sikoa, one of Reigns' cousins and the younger brother of The Usos (Jey Uso and Jimmy Uso), thus officially joining The Bloodline stable.

The event received universal acclaim from fans and critics, particularly for the Intercontinental Championship match which received five stars from Dave Meltzer, making this the second match on the main roster to get such a rating ever in the 2020s. The success of Clash at the Castle prompted WWE to return to the United Kingdom in July 2023 for their annual Money in the Bank event.

Production

Background

On October 25, 2021, the American professional wrestling promotion WWE revealed its 2022 major event schedule for the Raw and SmackDown brands, with an event slotted for Labor Day weekend at a to be determined location. On April 12, 2022, while the event's title was not revealed, WWE confirmed that the event would be held on Saturday, September 3 at Principality Stadium in Cardiff, Wales, marking the company's first major stadium event to be held in the United Kingdom (UK) in 30 years. Although WWE's last major event to take place in the UK was the 2003 Insurrextion, the promotion's last major event to be held in a stadium in the UK was the 1992 SummerSlam at the original Wembley Stadium. On April 29, 2022, during a WWE Live event at London's O2 Arena, WWE wrestler and UK native Drew McIntyre revealed the event's title as Clash at the Castle, a reference to Cardiff Castle, which is situated near the stadium. The event aired on pay-per-view (PPV) worldwide and was available to livestream through Peacock in the United States and the WWE Network in international markets. Unlike other WWE pay-per-view events broadcast in the UK, which air on BT Sport Box Office, Clash at the Castle aired on BT Sport 2, making it available for all subscribers. 

In the first 24 hours after the event's initial announcement, it was reported that 59,000 people had pre-registered for tickets. This broke a company record, with more fans registering for pre-sale tickets than any other WWE event, including WrestleMania. Tickets went on sale on May 20, with hospitality packages also available. By August 19, 2022, 63,803 tickets had been sold.

Storylines
The event compromised seven matches, including one on the Kickoff pre-show, that resulted from scripted storylines, where wrestlers portrayed heroes, villains, or less distinguishable characters in scripted events that built tension and culminated in a wrestling match or series of matches. Results were predetermined by WWE's writers on the Raw and SmackDown brands, while storylines were produced on WWE's weekly television shows, Monday Night Raw and Friday Night SmackDown.

On the July 8 episode of SmackDown, Drew McIntyre was scheduled to face fellow European native Sheamus to determine the number one contender for the Undisputed WWE Universal Championship at Clash at the Castle. As Sheamus feigned illness, the match did not occur. The match was later rescheduled for the July 29 episode as a Good Old Fashioned Donnybrook match, which McIntyre won. At SummerSlam the following night, Roman Reigns retained the undisputed titles, thus confirming that Reigns would be the defending champion against McIntyre at Clash at the Castle.

On the August 5 episode of SmackDown, Shayna Baszler won a gauntlet match to earn a match against Liv Morgan for the SmackDown Women's Championship at Clash at the Castle.

After Bianca Belair retained the Raw Women's Championship at SummerSlam, she was confronted by the newly formed stable of Bayley, Dakota Kai, and Iyo Sky. On the following episode of Raw, Bayley, Kai, and Sky interfered in a match between Alexa Bliss and Asuka. Belair would join the fray, siding with Bliss and Asuka. The following week, Bayley, Kai, and Sky challenged Belair, Bliss, and Asuka to a six-woman tag team match at Clash at the Castle, which was accepted by Belair.

At SummerSlam, Matt Riddle was originally scheduled to face Seth "Freakin" Rollins, however, the match was called off due to Riddle suffering an injury (kayfabe) incurred by Rollins on the Raw prior to the event. At the event, however, Riddle appeared and called out Rollins and the two brawled, which ended with Rollins performing the Stomp on Riddle. On the August 15 episode of Raw, Riddle revealed that he was medically cleared. Later that same night, Riddle engaged into another brawl with Rollins before challenging him to a match at Clash at the Castle, which was made official.

On the August 19 episode of SmackDown, Sheamus won a fatal five-way match to become the number one contender for Gunther's Intercontinental Championship at Clash at the Castle.

At SummerSlam, The Mysterios (Rey Mysterio and Dominik Mysterio) defeated The Judgment Day (Damian Priest and Finn Bálor) (with Rhea Ripley) after interference from Edge, who was kicked out of Judgment Day in June. Over the coming weeks, Edge and The Mysterios continued feuding with The Judgment Day, and on the August 22 episode, following Edge's win over Priest in the former's hometown of Toronto, Edge attempted a con-chair-to on Priest, only to be hit by a low blow by Ripley. Bálor joined the fight, only for Edge's wife, Beth Phoenix, to come to Edge's aid. The following week, after Priest and Bálor's match, Priest, Bálor, and Ripley vowed to end Edge's career at Clash at the Castle. Edge then appeared, leading to The Mysterios attacking Judgment Day, who were able to escape. Later that night, a match pitting Edge and Rey against Priest and Bálor was made official for Clash at the Castle.

Event

Pre-show
During the Clash at the Castle Kickoff pre-show, Madcap Moss teamed with The Street Profits (Angelo Dawkins and Montez Ford) to face the team of Austin Theory and Alpha Academy (Chad Gable and Otis) in a six-man tag team match. In the end, Ford performed a From the Heavens on Gable to win the match.

Preliminary matches
The actual pay-per-view opened with Alexa Bliss, Asuka, and Raw Women's Champion Bianca Belair facing Damage CTRL (Bayley, Dakota Kai, and Iyo Sky) in a six-woman tag team match. In the end, Sky performed a moonsault on Belair and Bayley pinned Belair to win the match.

Next, Gunther (accompanied by the reformed Imperium (Giovanni Vinci and Ludwig Kaiser)) defended the Intercontinental Championship against Sheamus (accompanied by The Brawling Brutes (Butch and Ridge Holland)). Before the match, a brawl ensued between The Brawling Brutes and Imperium, while Sheamus and Gunther stared each other down in the ring. During the match, Sheamus performed the White Noise and Celtic Cross on Gunther for a nearfall. In the closing moments, Gunther countered a Brogue Kick attempt from Sheamus and performed a powerbomb and lariat on Sheamus to retain the title. Following the match, Sheamus received a standing ovation from the crowd.

After that, Liv Morgan defended the SmackDown Women's Championship against Shayna Baszler. In the end, Morgan performed the Oblivion on Baszler to retain the title.

In the fourth match, Edge and Rey Mysterio (accompanied by Dominik Mysterio) faced The Judgment Day (Damian Priest and Finn Bálor; accompanied by Rhea Ripley). In the closing moments, Rey and Edge performed the 619 and Spear, respectively, on Bálor to win the match. Following the match, Dominik attacked Edge with a low blow and his father Rey with a clothesline, turning heel for the first time in his career, and ending his friendship with Edge.

In the penultimate match, Matt Riddle faced Seth "Freakin" Rollins. As Rollins attempted a rolling elbow, Riddle countered and applied the triangle choke on Rollins. Rollins countered the submission and performed the Bro Derek on Riddle for a nearfall. Rollins countered a powerbomb from Riddle and performed a Pedigree for a nearfall. Rollins mocked Riddle's tag team partner, Randy Orton, by performing a Hangman's DDT on Riddle. In the climax, Riddle threw Rollins on the announce table and attempted to attack Rollins with a steel chair, only for Rollins to avoid Riddle. As Riddle re-entered the ring, Rollins performed the Stomp. Rollins then performed a second Stomp on Riddle, this time from the middle rope, to win the match.

Main event
In the main event, Roman Reigns defended the Undisputed WWE Universal Championship against Drew McIntyre. During the match, as Reigns attempted a Superman Punch, McIntyre countered and performed the Future Shock DDT. Reigns then performed a Spear on McIntyre for a nearfall. Reigns applied the Guillotine on McIntyre, who escaped. As McIntyre performed the Claymore Kick on Reigns, Reigns inadvertently bumped into the referee, incapacitating him. Austin Theory ran out and attempted to cash in his Money in the Bank contract, however, professional boxer and UK native Tyson Fury, who was in the front row, knocked him out. Reigns then obtained a chair and entered the ring, however, McIntyre performed a Claymore on Reigns for a nearfall. In the climax, after Reigns performed another Superman Punch, he attempted a Spear, however, McIntyre countered and performed his own Spear on Reigns. McIntyre then performed a Claymore on Reigns, only for NXT's Solo Sikoa, a younger cousin of Reigns, to pull the referee outside the ring. Reigns then performed a Spear on McIntyre to retain the titles. Following the match, Fury entered the ring and shook Reigns' hand. Fury then tended to a disappointed McIntyre, who was seated in the corner of the ring, and stated that regardless of the result, McIntyre still made his country proud. Fury then lead McIntyre and the crowd into singing "American Pie", while McIntyre initiated the singing of "Don't look back in anger".

Reception
The event received universal acclaim for the Intercontinental Championship match which Dave Meltzer of the Wrestling Observer Newsletter gave five stars, making it WWE's second five-star match of 2022. The main event, however, was criticized by some for its ending. The match received a 4-and-a-half star rating, while Rollins vs. Riddle received a 4-and-a-quarter star rating. Triple H said that Clash at the Castle was a massive success, stating that Clash at the Castle was the number one international PPV in WWE history, the highest rated UK PPV in WWE history, and the best-selling non-WrestleMania event in WWE history.

Wesley Roesch of Wrestling Inc. called Clash at the Castle the "best 2022 Premium Live Event," stating that "from start to finish, the event was a classic." He stated that the six-woman tag team match "set up a feud between Bayley and Belair," and the SmackDown Women's Championship match was "a good women's title match." Roesch stated that Edge and Rey vs. Judgment Day was "an entertaining match", and Dominik "earned massive heat" with his attack on Edge and Rey. Roesch called the three "standout matches" on the card the Riddle vs. Rollins match, which "blew off an outstanding, personal jab-filled matchup," the Undisputed WWE Universal Championship match, which was a "30-minute clinic" between Reigns and McIntyre, and the Intercontinental title match, which Roesch stated as "the best match of the night" and a "five-star match of the year candidate," stating that Sheamus vs. Gunther was "an absolutely brutal, hard-hitting match that the crowd clearly loved," and that Gunther retaining the title was "a great way to put him over as a major threat in WWE."

Aftermath
Due to the success of Clash at the Castle, in January 2023, WWE announced that they would return to the United Kingdom for their annual Money in the Bank event in July 2023 in London, England.

Raw
On the following episode of Raw, Edge came out and stated that he had known Dominik Mysterio for a long time and recounted his history with the Mysterio family. Rey, Dominik's father, then came out and wanted an explanation for Dominik's actions. Dominik then came out, flanked by The Judgment Day (Finn Bálor, Damian Priest, and Rhea Ripley) and ignored his father. After Rey sadly walked backstage, Edge then vowed to get an answer out of Dominik, however, Judgment Day viciously attacked Edge. Later that night, Rey faced Priest in a losing effort. The following week, Edge defeated Dominik by disqualification after interference from The Judgment Day. After the match, they attacked Edge with a steel chair, ending the attack by placing the chair on Edge's leg and Bálor performing a Coup de Grâce on the chair. Two weeks later, Edge returned and challenged Bálor to an "I Quit" match at Extreme Rules, and Bálor accepted.

Also on Raw, footage was shown of Seth Rollins rejecting Matt Riddle's rematch challenge immediately after their match at Clash at the Castle. The following week, Riddle lost his match after interference from Rollins. On the September 19 episode, Riddle cost Rollins his United States Championship match. Later that night, Rollins caused Riddle to lose in tag team action. While the two were fighting backstage, Rollins challenged Riddle to a match, and Riddle accepted as a Fight Pit match for Extreme Rules. On October 1, UFC Hall of Famer Daniel Cormier was appointed as the special guest referee for the match.

Also, Damage CTRL (Bayley, Dakota Kai, and Iyo Sky) continued to target Alexa Bliss, Asuka, and Raw Women's Champion Bianca Belair. Kai and Sky went on to win the WWE Women's Tag Team Championship on the September 12 episode of Raw. The following week, Bliss, Asuka, and Belair interrupted Damage CTRL's celebration for Kai and Sky's victory, leading to a match between Bliss and Asuka for that episode's main event, where Bayley won. After the match, Kai, Sky, and Bayley attacked Bliss. Belair made the save, but was also attacked by the three, as was Asuka. Bayley then stated that she wanted a Raw Women's Championship match at Extreme Rules, reiterating the fact that she pinned Belair at Clash at the Castle. On the September 26 episode, Bayley challenged Belair to a ladder match for the title at Extreme Rules, and Belair accepted.

SmackDown
On the following episode of SmackDown, Solo Sikoa officially joined The Bloodline, thus making his main roster debut. Later that night, Sikoa fought Drew McIntyre where he lost via disqualification due to Karrion Kross attacking McIntyre, who would begin a rivalry with Kross. On September 23, a strap match between the two was scheduled for Extreme Rules.

Also on SmackDown, Imperium (Gunther, Ludwig Kaiser, and Giovanni Vinci) defeated The Brawling Brutes (Sheamus, Ridge Holland, and Butch) in a six-man tag team match. The following week, both teams took part in a fatal four-way tag team match to determine the number one contenders for the Undisputed WWE Tag Team Championship, which The Brawling Brutes (Butch and Holland) won. The following week, however, Butch and Holland failed to win the titles due to Imperium interfering. On September 29, a Good Old Fashioned Donnybrook match between the two teams was scheduled for Extreme Rules. Prior to Extreme Rules, Sheamus faced Gunther in a rematch for the Intercontinental Championship on the October 7 episode of SmackDown where Gunther retained after he struck Sheamus with a shillelagh while the referee was distracted.

Results

See also
2022 in professional wrestling
List of WWE pay-per-view and WWE Network events

References

External links
 

2022 WWE Network events
2022 WWE pay-per-view events
Events in Cardiff
Events in Wales
Events in the United Kingdom
WWE in the United Kingdom
September 2022 events in the United Kingdom